Lampronia aenescens is a moth of the family Prodoxidae first described by Walsingham in 1888. In North America it is found in Alberta and ranges west and south through southern British Columbia to northern California and Colorado.

The wingspan is 10.5–13.5 mm. The forewings are mostly unicolorous pale golden brown to pale straw yellow. The hindwings are uniformly gray. Adults are on wing in June.

The larvae feed on Rosa woodsii.

References

Moths described in 1888
Prodoxidae
Moths of North America